The syringe tide was an environmental disaster during 1987–88 in Connecticut, New Jersey and New York where significant amounts of medical waste, including hypodermic syringes, and raw garbage washed up onto beaches on the Jersey Shore, in New York City, and on Long Island. This forced the closing of beaches on the Atlantic coast. Officials scrambled to identify the source of the material as some local economies struggled with diminished tourism.

Reaction
Reports of medical waste and sewage spills drove away hundreds of thousands of vacationers, costing the $7.7-billion-a-year tourism industry on the Jersey Shore more than $1 billion in lost revenue that summer, tourism officials say. Later the losses were tallied between 15 and 40% of typical tourism revenue. It was a source of even greater turmoil due to the HIV/AIDS epidemic of the 1980s.

Sources and reaction
Officials finally traced the source of the waste to the Fresh Kills Landfill on Staten Island. After much deliberation, New York City was required to pay $1 million for past pollution damages as well as pay for the cleanup. No reparations were paid to the business owners on the Jersey Shore for revenues lost during the months of inactivity.

In response to syringe tides of 1987 and 1988, the participants in the New Jersey Harbor Estuary Program (HEP) implemented an extremely successful effort, known as the Short-term Floatables Action Plan. The plan has been implemented since 1989 and is supposed to curtail floatable debris wash-ups by intercepting debris slicks within the Harbor. The Short-term Floatables Action Plan has four key elements:

Surveillance: Environmental organizations conduct regular air and sea patrols of the Harbor to look for and report slicks of floatable debris.
Regular Cleanups: The United States Army Corps of Engineers (USACE) use cleanup vessels to collect floatable debris in the Harbor and focuses its activities on conditions when slicks are most likely to occur.
Non-routine Cleanups: USACE also attempts to capture additional debris slicks in the Harbor when they are detected and reported.
Communications Network: United States Environmental Protection Agency coordinates a reporting network as well as cleanup activities among all the program participants.

Popular culture
The Syringe Tide is referenced in Billy Joel's 1989 hit single "We Didn't Start the Fire" by the line "Hypodermics on the shore."

In The Simpsons episode "The Old Man and the 'C' Student", when punishing the students Principal Skinner sends Milhouse to the beach to "pick up all this medical waste that's washed up on the shore." Milhouse accidentally pricks himself on a syringe, and Skinner replies "Well, just keep working. You'll prick yourself with the antidote sooner or later."

The 1988 Skinny Puppy song "Hospital Waste" was written about the incident.

In the episode "The Gang Goes to the Jersey Shore" from It's Always Sunny In Philadelphia, Frank and Mac are on a beach covered in needles but blame it on New Jersey being the steroid capital of the world.

See also
Marine debris
Ocean Dumping Act
Medical Waste Tracking Act

References

1987 in the environment
1987 disasters in the United States
1988 in the environment
1988 disasters in the United States
Environment of New Jersey
Environmental issues in New York City
Ocean pollution
Waste disposal incidents in the United States
1987 health disasters
1988 health disasters
1987 in New York (state)
1988 in New York (state)
1987 in New Jersey
1988 in New Jersey
Waste management infrastructure of New York City